The 2022 Norwegian Second Division is a third-tier Norwegian women's football league season. The league consists of 71 teams divided into 8 groups. Reserve teams are not eligible for promotion. This is a transitional season; next season the league will consist of 28 teams divided into two groups.

League tables

Group 1
Odd – promotion play-offs
Stabæk 2
Arendal
Nanset
Gimletroll – relegation play-offs
Røa 2 – relegated
Sandefjord – relegated
Stathelle – relegated
Runar – relegated
Randesund/Amazon Grimstad 2 – relegated
Eik Tønsberg – relegated
GØIF/Helgerød – withdrew

Group 2
Grei – promotion play-offs
Sogndal
KFUM Oslo
Lyn 2
Frigg – relegation play-offs
Øvrevoll Hosle 2 – relegated
Ullensaker/Kisa – relegated
Hønefoss 2 – relegated
Snøgg – relegated
Bærums Verk Hauger – relegated
Høybråten og Stovner – relegated
Hallingdal – withdrew

Group 3
Kongsvinger – promotion play-offs
LSK Kvinner 2
Vålerenga 2
Fart
Sarpsborg 08 – relegation play-offs
Kolbotn 2 – relegated
Storhamar – relegated
Raufoss – relegated
Fredrikstad – relegated
Ottestad – relegated
Lillehammer – relegated
Gjelleråsen – withdrew

Group 4
Fyllingsdalen – promotion play-offs
Viking
Avaldsnes 2
Haugesund
Bryne
Loddefjord – relegated
Klepp 2 – relegated
Staal Jørpeland – relegated
Arna-Bjørnar 2 – relegated
Vidar – relegated
Os – relegated
Stord – relegated
Lura – withdrew

Group 5
Tiller – promotion play-offs
Molde
Rosenborg 2
Tynset
Herd
Hødd – relegated
Volda – relegated
Blindheim – relegated
Træff – relegated
Nardo – relegated
Byåsen – withdrew

Group 6
Grand Bodø 2 – relegated
Bossmo & Ytteren – promotion play-offs
Halsøy – relegated
Innstranden – relegated
Sandnessjøen – relegated
Brønnøysund – withdrew

Group 7
Mjølner – promotion play-offs
Medkila 2 – relegated
Harstad – relegated
Sortland – relegated
Kilkameratene/Medkila 3 – withdrew

Group 8
Porsanger – promotion play-offs
TIL 2020 2 – relegated
Kirkenes/Bjørnevatn/Hesseng
Senja/Finnsnes – relegated
Skarp – relegated
Polarstjernen – relegated
Bossekop/Alta – relegated
Tromsdalen – withdrew
HIF/Stein – withdrew

Promotion play-offs
The group winners, excluding reserve teams, take part in the promotion play-offs. Fyllingsdalen, Tiller and Porsanger received a bye to the second stage. Two teams were promoted.

First stage

Group 1
Odd – advance to second stage
Grei – advance to second stage
Kongsvinger

Group 2
Bossmo & Ytteren – advance to second stage
Mjølner

Second stage

Group 1
Grei – promoted
Porsanger
Tiller

Group 2
Fyllingsdalen – promoted
Odd
Bossmo & Ytteren

Relegation play-offs
The fifth-placed teams in group 1, 2 and 3 take part in the relegation play-offs. One of them was relegated.

Sarpsborg 08
Frigg
Gimletroll – relegated

References
General
2022 Norwegian Second Division at RSSSF
Specific

Norwegian Second Division (women) seasons
3
Norway
Norway